Městský stadion v Ostravě-Vítkovicích is a multi-purpose stadium in Ostrava-Vítkovice, Czech Republic. Used primarily for football, it is the home stadium of FC Vítkovice and FC Baník Ostrava. It also hosts the annual Golden Spike Ostrava athletics meeting. The stadium holds 15,123 spectators. It hosted the 2018 IAAF Continental Cup.

International matches
Městský stadion has hosted two competitive and two friendly matches of the Czech Republic national football team.

References

External links
 Stadium information

Football venues in the Czech Republic
Buildings and structures in Ostrava
Sports venues in the Moravian-Silesian Region
Czech First League venues
Sports venues completed in 1941
1941 establishments in Czechoslovakia
20th-century architecture in the Czech Republic